KPMT-LP was a low-power television station licensed to Pullman, Washington. It was on air briefly in November 2008. The station broadcast on UHF channel 14, with no separate digital channel.

The station was to initially operate as a translator to station KIDQ-LP Channel 27 which operates in the Lewiston, Idaho area. The station was to serve the college towns of Pullman, Washington and Moscow, Idaho and was to include local programming.

KPMT-LP was granted a displacement relief application on 3/24/2008 to move from channel 46 to channel 14 due to an interference issue with a co-channel translator at Grangeville, Idaho.

KPMT-LP's license was cancelled by the Federal Communications Commission on March 19, 2015 for failure to file a license renewal application.

External links

PMT-LP
Pullman, Washington
Television channels and stations established in 2007
Defunct television stations in the United States
Television channels and stations disestablished in 2015
2007 establishments in Washington (state)
PMT-LP
PMT-LP